Ernest Henley may refer to:

 Ernest Henley (athlete) (1889–1962), British athlete
 Ernest M. Henley (1924–2017), American atomic and nuclear physicist

See also
 William Ernest Henley (1849–1903), English poet